Vladimir Valerianovich Pribylovsky (6 March 195613 January 2016) was a Soviet and Russian political scientist, historian, journalist, human rights activist, and author of internet database Anticompromat.org on biographies of Russian politicians. He also authored more than 40 books.

Biography
Pribylovsky graduated from the Department of Medieval History of Moscow State University in 1981 specializing in Byzantine studies, and published several articles on early Byzantine history. In the 1980s he was persecuted by Soviet authorities for spreading banned literature.

Since 1993 he was the president of the Panorama Information and Research Center think tank. From November 2005 he operated the Russian-language website Anticompromat.org, which is essentially a collection of biographies of Russian politicians compiled and partially written by Pribylovsky from a variety of published sources. The site was included in the Federal List of Extremist Materials. On 31 March, after being shortly closed, the website moved to a Californian hosting.

Together with Yury Felshtinsky, Pribylovsky co-authored The Operation Successor, a book about Vladimir Putin's rise to power. Later versions were published as The Age of Assassins and Corporation. According to reviews, the book describes KGB's system of corporate rule in Russia.

His latest project was providing Russian language documents about corruption in Russia for international project "Kleptocracy Initiative", including documents on registration of cooperative Ozero.

On 13 January 2016, Pribylovsky was found dead in his Moscow apartment. His last book was "Around Putin". It was published after his death.  The body of Pribylovsky, according to his will, was cremated. He was buried at the Khovansky cemetery in Moscow.

Books
Guide to New Russian Political Parties and Organizations; Dec 1992 ;
National-patriots, Church and Putin. Parliamentary and Presidential Campaigns 1999–2000. By E.Mikhailovskya, V.Pribylovsky, A.Verkhovsky. 2001. 
, 2004

Yuri Felshtinsky, Vladimir Pribylovsky, The Corporation. Russia and the KGB in the Age of President Putin, Encounter Books; February 25, 2009, description.
Vladimir Pribylovsky The Purge by Vladimir Putin. Who has been eliminated, and who remains? (Russian), 2013,  Google books and review.
Around Putin. A biographical directory (Russian), Panorama, 2016, .  Online version of the book.
Animal Farm 2, an unofficial sequel to Animal Farm. Online version on  Orwell's Site

References

External links
Biography 
Anticompromat.org 
Panorama.ru 

1956 births
2016 deaths
Writers from Moscow
Moscow State University alumni
Russian journalists
Soviet journalists
Soviet Byzantinists
20th-century Russian historians
Russian Byzantinists
Russian political scientists
Russian political writers
Russian political activists
Soviet dissidents
Russian human rights activists
Soviet historians
Scholars of Byzantine history
21st-century Russian historians